The women's marathon T54 event at the 2020 Summer Paralympics in Tokyo, took place on 5 September 2021.

Records
Prior to the competition, the existing records were as follows:

Results
The race took place on 5 September 2021, at 6:40:

References

Women's marathon T54
2021 in women's athletics
Summer Paralympics